Films shown within films are occasionally rare to see given the nature of the context. Most of these cases represent the favorite films of the director, while others appear in comedy movies. The following is a list of films that show other films.

List

Notes

References

See also
 Story within a story
 List of films featuring fictional films

Lists of films